Rock Island High School, also known as "Rocky", is a public four-year high school located in Rock Island, Illinois, United States. Rocky is within the Rock Island–Milan School District 41, and the school colors are crimson and gold.

Administration

Principals
 Jeff Whitaker , Principal
 Carmen Woods, Assistant Principal
 Dan Logan, Assistant Principal

Deans
 Ivory Clark
 Katie Hartzler

Other administrators
 Robert Smith, President, RIEA
 Michelle Lillis, Athletic Director

Activities
Rock Island High School participates in the Illinois High School Association and is a member of the Western Big 6 Conference. Rock Island High School seeks to provide an array of activities to engage each student in finding their true passion.

Sports 
The Lady Rocks Swim Team won its first Western Big 6 Conference title in 21 years in November 2017. The Rocks won the IHSA 3A boys' basketball championship on March 19, 2011. They defeated the Centralia Orphans by a score of 50–40 in double overtime. The Lady Rocks softball team also won their first state title in 2018. The boys' soccer team won their first regional and conference titles in 2019. 
 
The Rocks have also won the IHSA Speech sectional for 11 years in a row, which has qualified them for the Illinois State Championship in speech, a contest that has no class divisions. The speech team has been recognized as one of the key players in the state tournament for more than 20 years.

Music 
The band was named an Illinois All-State Honor Band in 2013 by the Illinois Music Education Association. Under the direction of Peter Carlin, the Pride of Rock Island Marching Band has ranked among the best in the state and represented themselves as the premier marching band of the Quad Cities. The program consistently produces more ILMEA All-State musicians than any other in the immediate region.

Of the three choirs, the Chamber Singers are recognized throughout the Quad Cities for their Christmas tour. Further, the Chamber Singers are requested at many charitable events. Under the direction of Scott Voigt, the program constantly produces high numbers of ILMEA District 2 choir members, as well as All-State singers.

Furthermore Rock Island High School boasts two Orchestra classes due to the large number of enrollment in the program. The chamber orchestra, previously Rock Group performs at events, gigs. Mrs. Katrina Benson directs the Orchestras.

Campus

Rock Island Public Schools Stadium and Almquist Field
Rock Island High School has an on-campus stadium, the Rock Island Public Schools Stadium, with a seating capacity of nearly 16,000, the highest of any high school football stadium in the state. Within the stadium, Almquist Field is surfaced with an AstroTurf artificial turf.

The Rock Island High School Auditorium
The community has a 1930s art deco auditorium. The lower seating capacity is 1000 persons. The upper capacity is 500 persons. The proscenium measures 50 feet.

Notable alumni

Ken Bowman (1960) was an NFL center with the Green Bay Packers for ten seasons, then practiced law.
Charles Carpenter: highly-decorated Second World War artillery observation pilot nicknamed Bazooka Charlie; destroyed several German armored vehicles in his bazooka-equipped Piper L-4 Cub/Grasshopper light observation aircraft, christened Rosie the Rocketeer.
 Joel D. Collier (1949) is a former head coach for the Buffalo Bills and defensive coordinator, most notably with the Denver Broncos.
Steve Decker - former MLB catcher. Manager of the Connecticut Defenders (AA affiliate of the San Francisco Giants-Eastern League)
Therese Fowler (1985) - author, including of Z: A Novel of Zelda Fitzgerald (2013).
 Alan M. Garber, MD, PhD (1973) Provost of Harvard University, Mallinckrodt Professor of Health Care Policy at Harvard Medical School, Professor of Economics in the Faculty of Arts and Sciences, Professor of Public Policy in the Harvard Kennedy School of Government, and Professor in the Department of Health Policy and Management in the Harvard School of Public Health.  http://www.provost.harvard.edu/people/bio_agarber.php
Marcus Ward Lyon, Jr. (1893): zoologist, bacteriologist, and pathologist; president of the American Society of Mammalogists (1931–1933)
 Susann McDonald (1953) is a classical harpist and professor of music.  In 1989, she founded the USA International Harp Competition.
 Pete Mickeal (1996) is a professional basketball player, currently playing for Regal FC Barcelona.
 Don Nelson is a former professional basketball player and coach.  His 1335 victories as a head coach is the all-time record for a head coach in NBA history. Nelson was inducted into the Naismith Basketball Hall of Fame in 
 Gary Payton (1966) is a former astronaut who flew aboard the space shuttle Discovery as a part of mission STS-51-C.
 Chasson Randle, a professional basketball player and former college basketball player for Stanford University.
 Mark Schwiebert (1968) is the former mayor of Rock Island (1989–2009).
 Jonathan Tweet class valedictorian in 1983, game designer, author of Grandmother Fish, blogger
 Austin Wheatley (1995) is a former professional football player who briefly played for the New Orleans Saints in 2000.
 Derrick Willies (2013) is an NFL football player

 Sol Butler (1915) played in the NFL for the Rock Island Independents

References

Public high schools in Illinois
Buildings and structures in Rock Island, Illinois
Schools in Rock Island County, Illinois